"That's When the Music Takes Me" is a song written and originally recorded by Neil Sedaka in 1972. It is a track from his Solitaire LP, as it was billed in the UK, entitled as Neil Sedaka in the U.S.

The song became a hit in the UK and Ireland in early 1973, reaching the top 20 hit in both nations. It was released in the U.S. (#27) and Canada (#16) in 1975. It also became an easy listening hit, reaching the top ten on both nations' adult contemporary charts.

"That's When the Music Takes Me" features backing by 10cc.

The song is one of the few hit songs in which Sedaka wrote the lyrics in addition to the music. He uses the song as the finale to his concerts.

Personnel

 Neil Sedaka – piano, Fender Rhodes, lead vocals
 Graham Gouldman – bass guitar, backing vocals
 Lol Creme – guitar, backing vocals
 Kevin Godley – drums, percussion, backing vocals
 Eric Stewart – lead guitar, backing vocals

Chart history

References

External links
 

1972 songs
1972 singles
1975 singles
Neil Sedaka songs
Songs written by Neil Sedaka
The Rocket Record Company singles
Songs about music